Yashoda Palayad (Malayalam:യശോദ പാലയാട്) was an Indian playback singer and actress from Malayalam film industry in the 1960s’ and 70s.

Personal life and career 
Yashoda was born to late P. V. Krishnan Vaidyar and late Ammu Amma in 1946. She started her singing career through dramas at the age of ten with the song  and had also rendered mappilappattu. She was an active actress and singer in Kalanilayam and K.P.A.C. dramas. 

She debuted singing with the film  in 1962, composed by V. Dakshinamoorthy. Later she sung for various Malayalam movies like College Girl, Mister Sundari, Gandharvam to name a few. She has sung with K. J. Yesudas, P. Jayachandran, K. P. Brahmandan and many others. She also acted in the movie Thankakkudam in 1965 along with Prem Nazir and Sheela.

She has received Kerala Sangeetha Nataka Akademi Guru Pooja Award, Mappila Kala Academy Award and Abu Dhabi Indian Social Centre Award for her contributions to the music and drama.

Yashoda was married to Illikkal Raghavan and has two daughters and a son. Playback singer Sreya Raghav is her younger daughter. She died on 26 August 2014, at the age of 68.

See also 

 Kerala Sangeetha Nataka Akademi
 KPAC

References 

Indian women playback singers
Malayalam playback singers